General Winter refers to the Russian Winter, due to its role in thwarting invasions of Russia. General Winter may also refer to:

August Winter (1897–1979), German Wehrmacht general of mountain troops
Ormonde Winter (1875–1962), British Army brigadier general

See also
Henry Wynter (1886–1945), Australian Army lieutenant general